Wheelhouse Magazine is an online progressive arts and politics magazine, run by members of the Wheelhouse Arts Collective.

History and profile
First published in Winter 2007, the magazine is known for its left-leaning politics, its dedication to promoting new writers and artists, and its sponsoring of community projects--such as the New York Suicide Shows, The Evergreen State College Saturday Reading Series, and New York Stories. The magazine also features surrealist work.

Editors
Wheelhouse Magazine is edited by fiction writer and philosophy professor David Michael Wolach, and union organizer Eden Schulz.

Credits
Authors Recently Published: Nahid Rachlin, Tung Hui-Hu, Jim Ruland, Diane Lefer, Mimi Albert, Jared Carter, Lourdes Vázquez.
Visual and Multi-media artists exhibited: Daniel Johnston, Tom Carey, Mark Reuthold, David Schulz.
Essays Recently Published: Steve Heller, Rahul Kumar, Sheyene Foster Heller
Recent Reading Series Participants: Steve Almond, Tung Hui-Hu, Steve Heller, Jan Baross, Diane Lefer, Leonard Schwartz.

See also
List of literary magazines

References

External links
Wheelhouse Magazine Website

Magazines established in 2007
Online literary magazines published in the United States
Political magazines published in the United States
Visual arts magazines published in the United States